Hryhory Pekarski (born 8 January 1998) is a Belarusian swimmer. He competed in the men's 50 metre butterfly event at the 2018 FINA World Swimming Championships (25 m), in Hangzhou, China.

References

1998 births
Living people
Belarusian male swimmers
Male butterfly swimmers
Place of birth missing (living people)
Swimmers at the 2015 European Games
European Games competitors for Belarus